The Information Times is a daily Chinese-language newspaper published under the Guangzhou Daily Newspaper Group. The Information Times was founded in 1985 and is currently published in Guangzhou in Guangdong Province, China.

History
The Information Times was initially founded in 1985 as a daily financial newspaper. On May 15, 2001, The Guangzhou Daily Newspaper Group invested in an update to the paper, making it more comprehensive. Further revisions in the next few years saw the paper focus more on coverage of city news. Several events were planned to celebrate these revisions: 
June 2002: The Beijing–Guangzhou Railway was temporarily renamed the Information Times Line, and free newspapers were given to passengers.
January 2003: A luxury river boat was renamed the Information Times Line in honor of the newspaper.

In 2006, the newspaper became the largest-selling tabloid newspaper in Guangzhou.

In 2014, the Information Times was the 33rd most circulated daily newspaper in the world and 8th in China according to WAN-IFRA's World Press Trends Report.

Format
Section A: Political News and Commentary
Section B: Finance
Section C: Special Features
Section D: Entertainment and Lifestyle

See also

 List of newspapers in the People's Republic of China
 Media of the People's Republic of China

References

External links
 Information Times Online Version (in Chinese)

1985 establishments in China
Chinese-language newspapers (Simplified Chinese)
Publications established in 1985
Mass media in Guangzhou